National Highway 110 (NH 110 in short) links Siliguri to Darjeeling.  This  highway passes through Kurseong.

See also 
 List of National Highways in India by highway number
 National Highways Development Project
 Transport in Bihar

References

External links 
NH 110 on OpenStreetMap

Transport in Siliguri
National Highways in West Bengal
National highways in India
Transport in Darjeeling